Ecuador competed at the 2004 Summer Paralympics in Athens, Greece. The team included four athletes, three men and one woman, but won no medals.

Sports

Athletics

Men's track

Powerlifting

Men

Women

See also
Ecuador at the Paralympics
Ecuador at the 2004 Summer Olympics

References 

Nations at the 2004 Summer Paralympics
2004
Summer Paralympics